is a railway station in the town of Tsunan, Nakauonuma District, Niigata Prefecture, Japan operated by East Japan Railway Company (JR East).

Lines
Ashidaki Station is served by the Iiyama Line, and is 52.5 kilometers from the starting point of the line at Toyono Station.

Station layout
The station consists of one side platform serving a single bi-directional track. There is no station building, but only a shelter built directly on the platform. The station is unattended.

History
Ashidaki Station opened on 15 July 1960. With the privatization of Japanese National Railways (JNR) on 1 April 1987, the station came under the control of JR East.

Surrounding area
Shinano River

See also
 List of railway stations in Japan

References

External links

 JR East station information 

Railway stations in Niigata Prefecture
Iiyama Line
Railway stations in Japan opened in 1960
Tsunan, Niigata